Hagen is a surname. Notable people with the surname include:


A 
Aksel Hagen (born 1953), Norwegian politician
Alexander Hagen (born 1955), German sailor
Alice Mary Hagen (1872 – 1972), Canadian ceramic artist
Anders Hagen (1921–2005), Norwegian archaeologist
Anita Hagen (1931–2015), Canadian politician

B 
Bernhard Joachim Hagen (1720–1787), German composer, violinist and lutenist
Bruce Hagen (born 1930), American politician

C 
Carl I. Hagen (born 1944), Norwegian politician, former leader of the Progress Party and Vice-President of Stortinget
Cosma Shiva Hagen (born 1981), German actress
C. R. Hagen (born 1937), American physicist at the University of Rochester

D 
Daniel Hagen, American voice, television, and film actor
Daron Hagen (born 1961), American composer
David Hagen (1973–2020), Scottish footballer
David Warner Hagen (1931-2022), American jurist

E 
Earle Hagen (1919–2008), American composer
Edvald Boasson Hagen (born 1987), Norwegian cyclist
Edward Hagen (anthropologist) (born 1962), American biological anthropologist and professor
Edward Hagen (handballer) (1908–1963), American handball player
Edward Hagen (Minnesota politician) (1875–1950), American farmer, educator and politician
Eli Hagen (born 1947), wife and secretary of the Norwegian politician Carl I. Hagen
Erik Hagen (born 1975), footballer who played for FC Zenit Saint Petersburg
Eva-Maria Hagen (1934–2022), German actress and singer

G 
Georgina Hagen (born 1991), English actress
Gottfried Hagen (1230–1299), German town clerk
Gotthilf Hagen (1797–1884), German physicist and hydraulic engineer
Gulbrand Hagen (1864–1919), American newspaper editor, writer and photographer

H 
Halvor Hagen (born 1947), American football player
Hans Hagen (born 1953), professor of computer science at the University of Kaiserslautern
Harald Hagen (1902–1970), Norwegian sailor
Harlan Hagen (1914–1990), American politician
Harold Hagen (1901–1957), American politician
Hermann August Hagen (1817–1893), German entomologist
Horst Hagen (born 1950), German volleyball player

I 
I. Kathleen Hagen (born 1945), former medical doctor who gained notoriety for being accused of murder by asphyxia of her parents
Ingeborg Refling Hagen (1895–1989), Norwegian author and teacher
Ingebrigt Severin Hagen (1852–1917), Norwegian bryologist

J 
Jacob Hagen (1809–1870), businessman and parliamentarian in South Australia
Jean Hagen (1923–1977), American actress
Jimmy Hagan, (soccer) footballer, who played for Sheffield United F.C.
Johann Georg Hagen (1847–1930), American astronomer and Catholic priest
Julius Hagen (1884–1940), German film producer

K 
Karen Grønn-Hagen (1903–1982), Norwegian politician
Kenneth Sverre Hagen (1919–1997), American entomologist
Kevin Hagen (1928–2005), American actor

L 
Loren D. Hagen (1946–1971), United States Army Special Forces officer

M 
Magne Hagen (born 1938), Norwegian royal servant
Mark Rein·Hagen (born 1964), role-playing, card, video and board game designer
Mark von Hagen (born 1954), professor for Russian, Ukrainian, and Eurasian history at Arizona State University
Morten Hagen (born 1974), Norwegian golfer

N 
Natascha Hagen, Austrian singer-songwriter
Nina Hagen (born 1955), German female singer

O 
Oddbjørn Hagen (1908–1983), Norwegian skier
Olav Hagen (1921–2013), Norwegian cross country skier
Orville W. Hagen (1915–2007), American politician
Oskar Hagen (art historian) (1888–1957), German art historian
Oscar W. Hagen (1884–1945), American politician

P 
Paul Hagen (1920–2003), Danish film actor

R 
Rune Hagen (born 1975), Norwegian footballer

S 
Silvia Hagen, author
Stan Hagen (1940–2009), Canadian politician
Steffen Hagen (born 1986), Norwegian footballer
Stein Erik Hagen (born 1956), Norwegian businessman
Steve Hagen (born 1945), founder of the Dharma Field Zen Center
Steven van der Hagen (1563–1621), first admiral of the Dutch East India Company

T 
Theodor Hagen (music critic) (1823–1871), German-American writer on musical topics
Theodor Hagen (artist) (1842–1919), German landscape painter
Thoralf Hagen (1887–1979), Norwegian rower
Tom Hagen (businessman) (born 1950), Norwegian businessman
Tom Harald Hagen (born 1978), Norwegian footballer
Toni Hagen (1917–2003), Swiss geologist and development assistance pioneer in Nepal

U 
Ulrich Hagen (1925–2007), German scientist
Uta Hagen (1919–2004), American stage actress

V 
Veronika Hagen (born 1963), Austrian violist
Victor Wolfgang von Hagen (1908–1985), American explorer

W 
Walter Hagen (1892–1969), American Golfer
Walter Hagen (aviator) (1897–1963), German Luftwaffe Stuka pilot
William W. Hagen (born 1942), Professor of History at the University of California-Davis

Y 
Yngvar Hagen (1909 – 1993), Norwegian zoologist

See also
Hagens, a surname
Hagan (surname)
Van der Hagen, a surname
Von Hagen, a surname

Surnames
Norwegian-language surnames
German-language surnames
Danish-language surnames
Surnames of Norwegian origin
Surnames of Danish origin
Surnames of German origin
Surnames of Scandinavian origin
Surnames of Swedish origin